Mirghavan is a village in the Karmala taluka of Solapur district in Maharashtra state, India.

Demographics
Covering  and comprising 301 households at the time of the 2011 census of India, Mirghavan had a population of 1458. There were 756 males and 702 females, with 183 people being aged six or younger.

References

Villages in Karmala taluka